Yuke Songpaisarn (born 12 November 1988 in Bangkok, Thailand) is a Thai actor.

Life 
Yuke Songpaisarn comes from a fine family, consisting of his parents and one younger sister. His education and public service are his number one priorities. As an alumnus of Chulalongkorn University, he often returns to give talks to students, as well as donating towards the school and environment.

Career 
Yuke's entertainment career started from the 9th grade as he was featured in commercials, magazines, fashion/promotional events, and various music videos (most notably "Poo Chai Jai Yen" by Four-Mod). His debut role was leading in Kaew Lorm Petch alongside his most memorable leading lady, Wannarot Sonthichai (Vill). He earned the opportunity to fulfill his love for singing in 2013 with Grammy's subsidiary label, Frontage, leading the Kaen Sanaeha OST with “Jai Aoei (Oh My Heart)” and releasing his ballad “Roem Ton Rak Gan Mai (Back to Love)”

Filmography

Television series

Film

Ost.
 2013  -  
 2013  Ost.Kaen Sanaeha -  
 2014  Ost.Malee Rerng Rabum -  
 2014  Ost.Malee Rerng Rabum -  
 2018  Ost.Det Pik Nangfa -

Music video appearance
 2007 Poo Chay Jai Yen (ผู้ชายใจเย็น) - Four–Mod (Kamikaze/YouTube:welovekamikaze)  
 2008 Gae Ngow Hai Mai (แก้เหงาให้ไหม) - Paweesuda Janket (Mae The Star 4) (One Music/YouTube:oneMusic) 
 2008 Yoo Pur Tur (อยู่เพื่อเธอ) - Suparuj Techatanon (Ruj The Star 4) (One Music/YouTube:GMM GRAMMY OFFICIAL) 
 2011 Karng Karng Hua Jai (ข้างๆหัวใจ) -Napat Injaiuea (One Music/YouTube:oneMusic) 
 2017 Kae Nee Gaw Sook Jai (แค่นี้ก็สุขใจ) - Cocktail (Genie Records/YouTube:Genierock) 
 2018 CHANCE (โอกาส) - J.E.E.P. (LOVEiS Entertainment/YouTube:LOVEiS+)

Awards 
 The Most Popular Overseas Artist, 2013 Asian Idol Awards in Beijing, China for TV Series Likhit Fa Chata Din
 Most Popular Male Actor, 2012 Mekhala Awards for TV Series Sao Noi (total 6 winners in this category).

References

External links 
 

Living people
1988 births
Yuke Songpaisan
Yuke Songpaisan
Yuke Songpaisan
Yuke Songpaisan
Yuke Songpaisan
Yuke Songpaisan
Yuke Songpaisan
Yuke Songpaisan